Perakizumab (INN) is a humanized monoclonal antibody designed for the treatment of arthritis. It binds to IL17A and acts as an immunomodulator.

This drug was developed by Genentech/Roche.

References 

Monoclonal antibodies